Roger Victory is a Republican politician from Michigan currently serving in the Michigan Senate, representing the 31st district since 2023. He previously represented the 30th district from 2019 to 2022.

Biography 
Victory graduated from Davenport University in 1989 with a degree in business management. He is the owner of Victory Farms, LLC and Victory Sales, LLC. Victory is currently on the board of the Michigan Vegetable Council, Vice President of the Vriesland Growers Cooperative and serves on the National Council of Agricultural Employees.

Victory previously served in the Michigan House of Representatives from 2013 until 2019.

References

Living people
Republican Party members of the Michigan House of Representatives
Republican Party Michigan state senators
People from Hudsonville, Michigan
Davenport University alumni
21st-century American politicians
Year of birth missing (living people)